Cecilia Cheung Pak-chi (in Chinese 張栢芝, born 24 May 1980) is a Hong Kong actress and cantopop singer. Cheung is considered a "Sing girl"—an actress who first received media attention through starring alongside Stephen Chow, and later went on to her own successful career.

Biography 
Cheung was born in Man Wah Sun Chuen, Jordan, Hong Kong to Davies Shally, who is of half Chinese and half British descent, and Cheung Yan-yung. Her parents divorced when she was nine years old. She was sent to Melbourne to live with her aunt at the age of fourteen and then attended Camberwell Girls Grammar School. She has an elder half-sister, two younger brothers, and a younger half-brother from her father's side.

Career

Her career began in 1998, when she was cast in a television commercial advertising lemon tea. She caught the attention of Stephen Chow after shooting the ad. Later, Cheung made her film debut as a young nightclub hostess in Stephen Chow's King of Comedy (1999). King of Comedy became the highest grossing local film of the year, and shot Cheung to fame in Hong Kong. She then starred in Fly Me to Polaris (1999), which earned her the award for Best Newcomer at the Hong Kong Film Awards. Cheung also sung the theme song for Fly Me to Polaris, which gained attention among the masses for her singing ability. In the same year, Cheung launched her singing career with her first Cantopop album Any Weather (1999).

Cheung made inroads into the Korean market with Failan (2001) co-starring Choi Min-shik. The film earned her a nomination at the Grand Bell Awards for Best Actress. She then starred in the Chinese comedy film The Lion Roars (2002). Cheung impressed the audiences with her portrayal of the independent and spunky heroine, and won the Most Popular Actress award at the Chinese Film Media Awards.

Cheung reunited with Derek Yee in the crime thriller One Nite in Mongkok (2004) where she played a prostitute who cross paths with an assassin (played by Daniel Wu). She was nominated for the Best Actress award at the Hong Kong Film Awards for the third time. 

Cheung was cast in her first television project, where she played the legendary singer Zhou Xuan in The Wandering Songstress (2008). She was reportedly paid 200,000 yuan per episode to film the drama.

Cheung's next few films failed to achieve commercial success and were critically panned.

Cheung has earned 70 million HKD in 2014, ranking number nine in the top ten list of Hong Kong's highest (entertainment) celebrity incomes in 2014.

In early 2021, Cheung joined the second season of Chinese reality series Sisters Who Make Waves, a singing and dancing competition among 30 women with established entertainment careers.

Personal life
Cheung married fellow Hong Kong entertainer Nicholas Tse in a secret wedding ceremony in the Philippines in September 2006. She gave birth to their first son in August 2007 and their second son in May 2010.

On 23 August 2011, the couple made a public announcement of an agreement to a divorce. They agreed to hold joint custody of their two sons.

Cheung announced in a Weibo post from her studio that she had given birth to a third son on 18 November 2018, but the father of her son remains unknown.

In March 2020, Cheung voiced her support for Xinjiang cotton after several international companies announced that they will no longer purchase cotton from the region due to concerns over Uyghur human rights.

In June 2021, Cheung revealed on the Chinese variety show Life Is Beautiful 2 to fellow actress and friend Sheren Tang that if she were to enter a new relationship, she would not make it public. On the same show, Cheung revealed she had moved to Shanghai for several months and plans to reside in the city long term due to more work opportunities and to send her children to better schools.

Incidents

1999 Triad threat incident
In 1999, her triad member father, known as Bearded Bravery or Bearded Yung, got into a misunderstanding with a rival gang. As a result, Cheung received rape and death threats against her, when she was still relatively new in the film industry.

2008 Edison Chen Photo scandal

In January and February 2008, many explicit photos were found online involving Cheung and Edison Chen. The scandal also involved Gillian Chung and Bobo Chan.

Filmography

Discography

Awards and nominations

Notes

References

External links 
 
 

Living people
1980 births
20th-century Hong Kong actresses
21st-century Hong Kong actresses
21st-century Hong Kong women singers
Cantopop singer-songwriters
Hong Kong Christians
Hong Kong film actresses
Hong Kong television actresses
Hong Kong people of Chinese descent
Hong Kong people of British descent
Hong Kong emigrants to Australia
Hong Kong idols